This is a systematic list of 52 species of nematode (Phylum Nematoda) recorded along the coastal area of Sabah, Malaysia. Classification and nomenclature follow Platt & Warwick (1983).

MG - mangrove, SB -sandy beach.

References
 Shabdin and Othman (2000). Preliminary checklist of freeliving marine nematodes of Sabah, Malaysia. Sabah Parks Nature Journal, 3 : 41-53.
 Shabdin M.L. & B.H.R. Othman, 1999. Vertical distribution of an intertidal nematodes (Nematoda) and harpacticoid copepods (Copepoda:Harpacticoida) in muddy and sandy bottom of intertidal zone at Lok Kawi  Sabah, Malaysia. The Raffles Bulletin of Zoology, 47(2): 349-363. 
 Shabdin, M.L. and B.H.R. Othman, 2008. Horizontal distribution of intertidal nematode from Sabah, Malaysia. Journal of Tropical Biology and Conservation, 4: 39-53.
 Shabdin M.L. and B.H.R. Othman, 2005. Seasonal variations of nematodes assemblages in Sabah, Malaysia. The Philippine Scientist  42: 40-66.

Nematodes
Invertebrates of Malaysia
Nematodes, Sabah
Nematodes, Sabah